Rashidia is a monotypic genus of grasshoppers in the subfamily Oedipodinae, erected by Boris Uvarov in 1933 and containing the species Rashidia perplexa, found in Oman.

References

External links
 

Monotypic Orthoptera genera
Oedipodinae
Taxa described in 1933